Mongezi Feza (11 May 1945 – 14 December 1975) was a South African jazz trumpeter and flautist.

Biography

Feza was born in Queenstown, Cape Province, Union of South Africa, into a family of musicians, His elder brother, Sandi Feza, who taught him how to play the trumpet in the dusty streets of Mlungisi township in Queenstown.

A member of The Blue Notes, Feza left South Africa in 1964 and settled in Europe, living in London and Copenhagen. As a trumpeter, his influences included hard bopper Clifford Brown and free jazz pioneer Don Cherry. After The Blue Notes splintered in the late 1960s, he played with British rock musician Robert Wyatt, progressive rock band Henry Cow, and most extensively with fellow ex-Blue Notes musicians Johnny Dyani, Chris McGregor and Dudu Pukwana. Feza's compositions "Sonia" and "You Ain't Gonna Know Me ('Cos You Think You Know Me)" remained in the repertoire of his colleagues long after his death. In the early 1970s, Feza was also member of the afro-rock band Assagai.

Feza died in London, in December 1975, from untreated pneumonia.

Discography

Album appearances

Very Urgent (Chris McGregor's The Blue Notes) (Polydor, 1968)
Brotherhood of Breath (Chris McGregor) (1970)
Assagai (Assagai) (1971)
Zimbabwe (Assagai) (1971)
Music For Xaba Vol 1 and Vol 2 (with Johnny Dyani and Okay Temiz) (1972) Sonet Records SNTF 642 and SNTF 824
Rejoice (with Johnny Dyani and Okay Temiz) (1972) re-issued by Cadillac Records SGC 1017  (1988)
 Live at Willisau (Chris McGregor's Brotherhood of Breath) (Ogun, 1974)
Theatre Royal Drury Lane 8th September 1974  (Robert Wyatt) (1974)
Rock Bottom  (Robert Wyatt) (1974)
In Praise of Learning  (Henry Cow), (1975)
Ruth Is Stranger Than Richard  (Robert Wyatt) (1975)
Pressure Drop (Robert Palmer) (1975)
Travelling Somewhere (Chris McGregor's Brotherhood of Breath) (Cuneiform, 2001) recorded in 1973
Bremen to Bridgwater (Chris McGregor's Brotherhood of Breath) (Cuneiform, 2004) recorded in 1971 and 1975
Free Jam with the Bernt Rosengren Quartet (Ayler Records, 2004) recorded in 1972
Up to Earth (Chris McGregor Septet) (Fledg'ling, 2008) recorded in 1969

with Harry Miller's Isipingo

Which Way Now, Cuneiform Records (1975)

with Dudu Pukwana
Dudu Phukwana and the "Spears", Quality LTJ-S 232 (1969) reissued by Matsuli Music in 2020
In The Townships (Dudu Pukwana & Spear), Virgin Records C 1504 (1973) (album dedicated to the memory of Mongezi Feza)
Flute Music (Dudu Pukwana & Spear), Caroline Records (UK) CA 2005, Virgin Records CA 2005 (1975)
Diamond Express (Dudu Pukwana), Freedom Records FLP 41041 (1977)

Underground recordings

1965 The Blue Notes featuring vocalist Patrice Gcwabe
1967 The Blue Notes featuring vocalist Tunji Oyelana
1968 Unissued LP (Bootleg) of Brotherhood of Breath.

Bibliography
Philippe Carles, André Clergeat, and Jean-Louis Comolli, Dictionnaire du jazz, Paris, 1994

References

1945 births
1975 deaths
20th-century trumpeters
Assagai members
Brotherhood of Breath members
Centipede (band) members
Deaths from pneumonia in England
South African expatriates in Denmark
South African expatriates in England
South African jazz trumpeters
South African jazz flautists
The Blue Notes members
20th-century flautists